, known in some major English adaptations as Jimmy Kudo, is a fictional character and the main protagonist of the manga series Case Closed, created by Gosho Aoyama. A high school detective, he is forced to ingest the lethal poison  after an encounter with Gin and Vodka, agents of the mysterious Black Organization, while they were having a secret deal in an amusement park. Due to a rare side effect, the poison did not kill him. Instead, it shrinks his body into that of an elementary school-age child and forces him to adopt the pseudonym  to hide from those who poisoned him. He lives with his childhood friend Ran Mouri and her father Kogoro Mouri as he awaits the day he can take down the Black Organization and regain his original size.

Creation and conception
The idea that Shinichi Kudo would be turned into a child stemmed from the idea of a Tortoiseshell cat Sherlock Holmes as a protagonist. Gosho Aoyama's idea was the cat would indicate the crucial evidence needed to solve the case; a performance the child-turned Shinichi does to help those around with the investigation. Shinichi was inspired by the fictional private eye Shunsaku Kudo. Aoyama revealed that his editor was against the name Conan due to the protagonist from the anime series Future Boy Conan sharing the same name and had suggested to name him Doyle instead. The author stuck with the name Conan believing it would overtake the Future Boy series. According to Aoyama, Shinichi's catch phrase, was thought of by the anime adaptation's script writer and written into chapter 95 of the manga at the same time. In the English localizations, the catch phrase is translated as "One Truth Prevails".

Appearances

In Case Closed
Shinichi appears at the beginning of the series as a gifted 16-year-old student at Teitan High School in Tokyo. He was already well known as a brilliant young detective who had closed many difficult cases that the professionals could not. He is also secretly in love with his childhood best friend Ran Mouri (Rachel Moore), but refuses to admit his feelings due to both stubbornness and shyness. Later while on a date with Ran to a theme park, Shinichi leaves Ran and follows two suspicious characters, Gin and Vodka, suspecting they are criminals. Gin ends up attacking Shinichi and forces him to drink an experimental poison APTX (Apotoxin)  which is supposed to kill him, and then leaves him for dead. However, instead of killing Shinichi, a rare side-effect occurs, causing his age to regress, and he shrinks into the form of a young child. With advice from Dr. Hiroshi Agasa, Shinichi adopts the identity of Conan Edogawa, devised from the names of Arthur Conan Doyle and Edogawa Rampo to prevent Gin, Vodka, and their syndicate, the Black Organization, from returning to kill him and those around him. For this reason, he chooses not to reveal his true identity to anyone else, to keep them safe.

Shinichi pretends to be a distant relative of Dr. Agasa's and is placed in the care of Ran and her father, Kogoro Mouri (Richard Moore), who owns a detective agency. Shinichi and Dr. Agasa feel that some clues regarding the Black Organization may possibly filter through the agency, allowing Shinichi to learn more about them to ultimately bring them down. As for Shinichi's disappearance, Conan has to constantly find creative ways to fool Ran into believing he is off solving a very difficult case and will return once the investigation is concluded. This becomes increasingly difficult as she begins to suspect who he really is.

As a child, Conan must attend Teitan Elementary, where he inadvertently forms a detective club called the Detective Boys (Junior Detective League) with friends he makes at the school. Conan is forced to adapt to his new daily life and becomes accustomed to attending elementary school while secretly helping Richard solve crimes with the use of his gadgets invented by Dr. Agasa. The most prominent of these are: his voice-changing bowtie, allowing him to impersonate anyone's voice; his customized glasses which allow him to track and listen through his covert listening devices; his super sneakers which multiply his kicking force; his wrist watch stun gun, which allows him to tranquilize Richard or a criminal; his Solar Powered skateboard as well as a soccer ball dispenser belt, super strong/elastic suspenders, among others.

Conan eventually meets Heiji Hattori (Harley Hartwell), a detective from Osaka who is seeking to challenge Shinichi in a deductive battle. After drinking baijiu while sick with a cold, Conan reverts to a teenager and rectifies a deduction made by Heiji. In their second encounter, Heiji is able to deduce Conan's identity as Shinichi Kudo and confronts him about it. The two later become good friends.

As the series progresses, Conan befriends biochemist Shiho Miyano, a former member of the Black Organization and inventor of the APTX-4869 drug. She and her sister had grown up within the organization, as their scientist parents had been members too, before their deaths. After her sister was killed by Gin, she took the poison to commit suicide. However, like Shinichi, her age regressed and she shrank back to a small child's size. She then escapes and adopts the pseudonym Ai Haibara (Anita Hailey). Dr. Agasa ends up taking her in, and she vows to help Conan take down the Black Organization. She later invents a prototype antidote to the APTX-4869 allowing Conan to temporarily become Shinichi again, which Conan uses on occasion to fool Ran when she suspects his true identity. During the events of Holmes' Revelation, Shinichi, while in his original form, confesses his feelings to Ran in London. In The Scarlet School Trip, Ran returns those feelings by giving Shinichi a kiss on the cheek.

Conan's investigation of the Black Organization leads him to discover the American FBI's existence in Japan, as they are also investigating the syndicate. The head of the syndicate, often referred to as 'that person' and 'boss' by syndicate members, who is at least one-hundred and thirty, is Renya Karasuma. However, the FBI and Conan are currently unaware of this. His collaboration with FBI agents Jodie Starling and Shuichi Akai allows them to capture organization member Kir. They discover she is really an undercover CIA agent and return her to the organization to continue to spy from within.

In other media
Shinichi Kudo has appeared in all of the feature films of the series, both the original video animation series (Shōnen Sunday Original animations and the Magic Files), the two-hour cross-over television special Lupin the 3rd vs Detective Conan, and is the protagonist in all Case Closed-related video games. He is the protagonist in the novels of the series. In the 2006–2007 live-action series, he is portrayed by Shun Oguri as a teenager and Nao Fujisaki in child form. In the 2011 live-action movie and TV drama series, Junpei Mizobata portrays the teenage Shinichi.

In 2006, the Japanese government used Conan in campaigns to help promote crime awareness among children. Targeting the same audience, Japan's Ministry of Foreign Affairs used Conan and his friends in two pamphlets: one to promote the ministry's mission, the other to introduce the 34th G8 summit held in the country in 2010. Conan and his friends were also featured in the sixth installment of the Anime, Heroes and Heroines commemorative stamp series issued by Japan Post in 2006.

Reception
In the survey "friendship" developed by rankingjapan.com in which people had to choose what anime character they would like to have as a friend, Shinichi ranked third. In Newtype magazine Shinichi ranked fourth and ninth in the 2001 and 2010 polls for most popular male anime character, respectively. In the Animages Anime Grand Prix awards from 1998, Shinichi was voted as the tenth most popular male anime character. Mania Entertainment rated Conan as the third greatest anime detective. Shinichi Kudo and Conan Edogawa were the second and third most popular characters in the series defined by a poll on ebooksjapan.jp. Jian DeLeon of Complex magazine named him eighteenth on a list of "The 25 Most Stylish Anime Characters." Additionally, in 2017 Charapedia poll, Kudo ranked as the 5th most ideal Prime Minister in anime series. Conan won the "clever" award in the Animedia'''s magazine "Animedia Character Awards 2019" for standout anime characters chosen by the readers. In Japanese, Danganronpa 2: Goodbye Despair protagonist Hajime Hinata was voiced by Takayama. Due to Kudo's popularity, the game staff developed a snowboarding minigame as Kudo often surfs a turbo skateboard. In a Japanese poll from AnimeAnime'', Kudo was voted as the best character voiced by Takayama.

Notes

References

Case Closed characters
Child characters in anime and manga
Comics characters introduced in 1994
Fictional amateur detectives
Fictional characters based on Sherlock Holmes
Fictional characters from Tokyo
Fictional characters with alter egos
Fictional Japanese people in anime and manga
Male characters in anime and manga
Teenage characters in anime and manga